Stephen Philip Sedgley (born 26 May 1968) is an English former professional footballer, and football manager.

As a player, he was a midfielder and a defender. He was capped 11 times for England at under-21 level.
who made more than 450 appearances in the Football League and Premier League for Coventry City, Tottenham Hotspur, Ipswich Town and Wolverhampton Wanderers. He became manager of Kingstonian in 2001, and later joined the coaching staff of Luton Town.

Playing career
Sedgley was born in Enfield. He made more than 180 first-team appearances for Tottenham Hotspur as a player after a £750,000 move from Coventry City in July 1989 before switching to Ipswich Town for £1 million in June 1994. More than 100 appearances followed for Ipswich before the final move of his playing career, a £500,000 transfer to Wolverhampton Wanderers in July 1997, where he again made more than 100 League appearances before retiring from the game in December 2000. He has two FA Cup-winners' medals. The first came with Coventry, as an unused substitute in the 3–2 defeat of Spurs in the 1987 final. He received his second in 1991 when Spurs beat Nottingham Forest 2–1.

Coaching career
Sedgley was appointed manager of Kingstonian in October 2001, stepping up from the position of coach, but resigned 14 months later, citing "a clash of opinions off the pitch with the club's owners". A UEFA-qualified coach, Sedgley was appointed as a youth team coach at Luton Town in mid-October 2005 where he worked alongside Marvin Johnson until new manager Kevin Blackwell brought in his own backroom staff in 2007.

Honours
Coventry City
FA Cup: 1987

Tottenham Hotspur
FA Cup: 1991
FA Charity Shield: 1991

References

External links 
 

1968 births
Living people
Footballers from Enfield, London
English footballers
England under-21 international footballers
Coventry City F.C. players
Tottenham Hotspur F.C. players
Ipswich Town F.C. players
Wolverhampton Wanderers F.C. players
English Football League players
Premier League players
English football managers
Association football midfielders
Association football defenders
FA Cup Final players